Keagan Clint Africa (born 6 April 1985) is a former South African cricketer who represented KwaZulu-Natal between 2004 and 2007. He played as a right-arm medium-pace bowler.

Africa was born in Johannesburg and attended Hilton College. He represented the South African under-19 team at the 2004 Under-19 World Cup in Bangladesh, and took eight wickets from six matches. In his team's narrow one-wicket loss to Nepal, he scored 52 not out from ninth in the batting order, and then took 3/36 from ten overs opening the bowling. Africa made his first-class debut for KwaZulu-Natal in October 2004, and his limited overs debut just over a week later. He made semi-regular appearances over the following three seasons, and played his last game in November 2007. In total, Africa took 41 wickets from 19 first-class matches and 24 wickets from 22 limited-overs matches. His best figures for KwaZulu-Natal, 5/23 from 16 overs, came in the second innings of a Three-Day Challenge game against Border in January 2007.

See also
 List of Old Hiltonians

References

External links
Player profile and statistics at CricketArchive
Player profile and statistics at ESPNcricinfo

1985 births
Living people
Alumni of Hilton College (South Africa)
KwaZulu-Natal cricketers
South African cricketers
Cricketers from Johannesburg